Thielman's Independent Cavalry Battalion (Illinois) was a cavalry battalion that served in the Union Army during the American Civil War.

Service
Thielman's Battalion was amalgamated from Thielman's and Marx's Independent Cavalry Companies at Smithland, Kentucky on December 9, 1861.

The battalion was amalgamated with the 16th Illinois Cavalry as Companies "A" and "B" but did not join the main body of the regiment until January 1864.

Total strength and casualties

Commanders
Major Milo Thielman

See also
List of Illinois Civil War Units
Illinois in the American Civil War

Notes

References
The Civil War Archive

Units and formations of the Union Army from Illinois
1861 establishments in Kentucky
Military units and formations established in 1861
Military units and formations disestablished in 1862